Siran may refer to:

Geography
Siran, Cantal, a commune in the department of Cantal, France
Siran, Hérault, a commune in the department of Hérault, France
Siran, East Azerbaijan, a village in East Azerbaijan Province, Iran
Siran, Markazi, a village in Markazi Province, Iran
Siran, Shazand, a village in Markazi Province, Iran
Siran, West Azerbaijan, a village in West Azerbaijan Province, Iran
Şiran, a town in northeastern Turkey
Siran Valley, valley in Khyber Pakhtunkhwa, Pakistan

People
Sigiramnus (Siran, Cyran), 7th century Frankish saint

See also
 Siren (disambiguation)